Route 109 is a Quebec provincial highway that runs through the western regions of Abitibi-Témiscamingue and Nord-du-Québec. From there, the highway extends  to Matagami, where the road continues northwards as James Bay Road (French: Route de la Baie James). While now classified as a municipal road, the James Bay Road was part of provincial Route 109 until 2002. Consequently, some maps may still identify it as such.

The 182 km section of Route 109 between Saint-Dominique-du-Rosaire and Matagami winds through complete wilderness and no services exist at all here. There is however extensive logging taking place along this section.

Municipalities along Route 109

 Rivière-Héva
 La Motte
 Saint-Mathieu-d'Harricana
 Amos
 Saint-Félix-de-Dalquier
 Saint-Dominique-du-Rosaire
 Baie-James
 Matagami

Major intersections

See also
 List of Quebec provincial highways

References

External links  
 Official Transport Quebec Road Map (Courtesy of the Quebec Ministry of Transportation) 
 Route 109 on Google Maps

109
Amos, Quebec
Roads in Abitibi-Témiscamingue